"Lotta Lovin'" is a song by American rockabilly singer Gene Vincent and The Blue Caps.

Background
The song was recorded at Capitol Studios in Los Angeles and released as a 45 single with "Wear My Ring", co-written by Bobby Darin as the B side. Gene Vincent performed the songs on his first appearance on the TV show American Bandstand, hosted by Dick Clark.

The lead guitarist on the track was Johnny Meeks, who had replaced Cliff Gallup.

The song was produced by Ken Nelson. Bernice Bedwell wrote the song, who played the song over the telephone to Vincent. He also recorded "In My Dreams" and "Lonesome Boy" by Bedwell.

Reception
It reached #7 on the U.S. R&B chart and #13 on the U.S. pop chart in 1957.

Other versions
Mickey Gilley, as a single in 1965, but it did not chart.
Don McLean, on his 1978 album Chain Lightning.
Jeff Beck and Big Town Playboys, on their 1993 album Crazy Legs.
Ray Campi in 1996
Danny Gatton in a recording released in 1998

References

1957 songs
1957 singles
1965 singles
Gene Vincent songs
Mickey Gilley songs
Don McLean songs
Jeff Beck songs
Song recordings produced by Ken Nelson (American record producer)
Capitol Records singles